Aldis Kušķis (born 6 October 1965, in Riga, Latvia) is a Latvian politician. From 2004 till 2009 he was Member of the European Parliament for the New Era Party; part of the European People's Party.

References

External links
 

1965 births
Living people
Politicians from Riga
New Era Party politicians
Deputies of the 8th Saeima
New Era Party MEPs
MEPs for Latvia 2004–2009